Newtonville station is a commuter rail station on the MBTA Commuter Rail Framingham/Worcester Line, located between the Massachusetts Turnpike and Washington Street at Newtonville Square in the village of Newtonville in Newton, Massachusetts. Stairway entrances are located on the bridges over the Turnpike at Walnut Street and Harvard Street. Newtonville station is not accessible; renovations for accessibility are planned.

History

Hulls Crossing station opened as a flag stop on the Boston and Worcester Railroad in 1842. It was first located on the south side of the tracks on the west side of Harvard Street, then later moved to the east side. The first station agent, Joshua Ramsdell, worked at Newtonville from 1844 to 1889, by which time he was "probably the oldest station agent in New England".

A red brick station was constructed slightly to the east in the 1870s, one of a small number of B&A stations built that decade. It ultimately became the first stop outside Boston for long-distance trains on the Boston and Albany Railroad. After Amtrak took over intercity service in 1971, the Bay State briefly stopped at Newtonville.

The present station has one active side platform next to the southern track (Turnpike side); trains on the other track can be boarded via a wooden crossing, as is occasionally done when the southern track is closed for repairs.  A second platform, now abandoned, sits aside the northern track. Both platforms are low level.

The station was temporarily closed on October 22–25, 2019, while repairs were made to the stairs.

Renovations

None of the stations on the Framingham line in Newton — Newtonville, and  — are accessible. All have only one active platform, all low-level, and all are accessed by stairs. The MBTA has proposed three alternative plans to make the Newton stations accessible, so as to comply with the Americans with Disability Act. Plan 1 would add a high level platform on only one track, would cost an estimated $46 million and would take five years to complete. Plan 2 would have high-level side platforms on both tracks, would cost $129 million and take 8 years. The platform on the north side would be built first and used for service while the south platform was rebuilt. Plan 1 could be upgraded to Plan 2 at a later date. All stations would remain in service during construction of both plans. A more elaborate plan 3 would cost 218 million. Plan 3 would have center island platforms at each station and would take 12 years. Each station would have to be closed during its construction. Plans 2 and 3 would permit increased service to Newton, up to 20 inbound trains per day vs the current and Plan 1 limit of 13.

The MBTA opted for Alternative 1, providing a single side platform at each station, and awarded a design contract to Vanasse Hangen Brustlin. The projected timeline had all stations being complete by June 2024. Design reached 30% in November 2020 and was expected to be complete in spring 2022. The designs were later changed to have two platforms to reduce operational impacts. The new design reached 30% completion in early 2022. A ramp was added to the design scope at that time, delaying expected design completion to February 2024. Drilling for geotechnical surveying took place in October–November 2022.

Bus connections
Newtonville is served by one local MBTA bus route on Walnut Street, and three express routes on Washington Street:
: Needham Junction–Watertown Square
: Roberts–Federal Street & Franklin Street
: Waverly Square–Federal Street & Franklin Street
: Waltham Highlands–Federal Street & Franklin Street

References

External links

 MBTA – Newtonville
 Harvard Street entrance from Google Maps Street View
 Walnut Street entrance from Google Maps Street View

Former Boston and Albany Railroad stations
MBTA Commuter Rail stations in Middlesex County, Massachusetts
Former Amtrak stations in Massachusetts
Railway stations in Middlesex County, Massachusetts
Newton, Massachusetts